This is a list of books and novelisations for the ITV science fiction drama series Primeval.

Novels for 12+
These books are novelisations of episodes, published by Puffin Books in paperback.

Novels for 14+
Four original novels, not novelisations of broadcast episodes,  have been published by Titan Books. The first is Shadow of the Jaguar by Steven Savile, which revealed that anomalies do appear overseas. The second novel, written by acclaimed fantasy writer Paul Kearney, is entitled The Lost Island. The third, Extinction Event is by Dan Abnett who has also written "Torchwood" and "Doctor Who" books. The fourth and thus far final novel, entitled Fire and Water, is by Simon Guerrier and features Danny Quinn as lead character.

Activity books
Ladybird Books has published two sticker books (one of which is a glow in the dark sticker book) a poster book, a tattoo activity title, a wipe-clean activity book, and a summer annual for children from five to eight years old.

See also
 List of television series made into books

Notes

Books
Primeval